Fern Cave National Wildlife Refuge is a  National Wildlife Refuge located in northeastern Alabama, near Paint Rock, Alabama in Jackson County.

Despite receiving more than 1,200 visitors per year, the facility is unstaffed; it is administered by the Wheeler National Wildlife Refuge in Decatur, Alabama.

Topography
Most of the Fern Cave NWR is on the western side of Nat Mountain between Scottsboro and Huntsville, Alabama. The Paint Rock River, a tributary of the Tennessee River borders the northwestern side of the refuge. Elevation ranges from the relative flat area around the Paint Rock River valley to a 1,500+ foot elevation at the top of the mountain.

Fern Cave

Fern Cave NWR is named after the eponymous cave located in the region; in it, explorers found an abundance of American hart's-tongue ferns (Asplenium scolopendrium var. americanum); in the modern day, the variation/subspecies is considered federally endangered. The fern population in the cave has been drastically reduced since 1985 from a high of twenty, due to the actions of illegal plant collectors. The fern also grows in a small cave pit in Morgan County, but it is closed off for similar reasons.

Fern Cave itself is described as a "vertical and horizontal maze". There are 12 different levels connected by canyons and pits. The cave remains very inaccessible. At least one experienced caver has died in the cave.

There are five entrances to the cave, with only four of them being within the Fern Cave NWR. The fifth entrance is owned by the Southeastern Cave Conservancy. Currently, the cave is closed to the public.

Wildlife
Fern Cave serves as a home to the largest colony of federally endangered gray bats in the United States. NWR officials estimate that over 1.5 million gray bats use the cave annually. Biologists with the US Fish and Wildlife Service have confirmed the presence within the cave of the fungus that causes white nose syndrome.

Approximately 200 species of animals use the refuge. Other than the endangered bats, the cave contains southern cavefish (Typhlichthys subterraneus), blackbarred crayfish (Cambarus unestami), Spotted-tail salamanders (Eurycea lucifuga), and northern slimy salamanders (Plethodon glutinosus). Other fish species in the refuge include banded sculpin (Cottus carolinae), bluegill (Lepomis macrochirus) and yellow bullhead catfish (Ictalurus natalis). Outside of the cave, mammals include white-tailed deer (Odocoileus virginianus), wild turkeys (Meleagris gallopavo), squirrels (Sciurinae sp.), opossums (Didelphis virginiana), raccoons (Procyon lotor), and the rare-in-Alabama snowshoe hare (Lepus americanus).

Facilities

Fern Cave is not open to the public in order to protect the endangered bats and ferns that reside within. The remaining portion of the Refuge is open to the public, although its use is limited due to the rugged topography.

There are opportunities for hiking, photography, and wildlife observation (such as bats) at the refuge. Even though the bats leave the cave nightly for food, the refuge recommends against viewing the emergence, since the area around the cave entrances is steep and potentially dangerous in the dark; due to this, the park closes around dusk.

Images

See also
 List of National Wildlife Refuges

References

External links
 Fern Cave National Wildlife Refuge homepage
 Recreation.gov overview

Protected areas of Jackson County, Alabama
National Wildlife Refuges in Alabama
Caves of Alabama
Landforms of Jackson County, Alabama